Hegyhátszentjakab is a village in Vas County, in the west region of Hungary.

Geography
It covers an area of 832.22ha and has a population of 300 people (2005).

Populated places in Vas County